= Campeonato de Portugal =

Campeonato de Portugal may refer to:

- Campeonato de Portugal (1922–1938), a defunct knockout Portuguese association football competition that preceded the Taça de Portugal
- Campeonato de Portugal (league), the fourth-tier Portuguese association football league
